Robert Richard Scanlan (1801–1876), sometimes known as R. R. Scanlan, was an Irish painter and portraitist.

A resident of Dublin in the 1820s, he exhibited portraits at the Royal Hibernian Academy (1826–1864), and was later Master of the Cork School of Design. 
He painted portraits and watercolour portrait groups, described by Professor Anne Crookshank of Trinity College Dublin as charmingly evocative of the leisured society of Victorian Ireland. He spent his later life in London and exhibited at the Royal Academy (1837–1859).

Two of his best known works were portraits of Prime Ministers, Sir Robert Peel and the Duke of Wellington.

References

Irish Watercolours and Drawings: Works on Paper C.1600-1914 By Anne Crookshank, Knight of Glin. (page 331)

1801 births
1876 deaths
19th-century Irish painters
Irish male painters
People from County Cork
19th-century Irish male artists